Woodburn is a small highway town on the banks of the Richmond River in New South Wales, Australia. 
Until the town was bypassed in September 2020, the busy Pacific Highway passed through the centre of town. Woodburn is 712 km north of the state capital, Sydney, and 34 km south of the regional city of Lismore.

Prior to the arrival of European settlers in the 1840s, the Woodburn area—known as Maniworkan to the Indigenous inhabitants—was the home of the Bundjalung people. Woodburn was an important river port until the decline in river transportation along the Richmond led to a decline in the town's own fortunes. Prior to being bypassed, the income associated with the town's position on one of Australia's major highways was important to the local economy, as are the fields of sugar cane surrounding the town. The tourist resort of Evans Head is 10 km south-east of Woodburn.

Woodburn is part of the Richmond Valley Shire, the administrative headquarters of which is in nearby Casino. Huge flooding inundated the town for days in February 2022, destroying many homes, businesses and vehicles.

Schools
 Woodburn Public School
 St Joseph's Primary School

References

External links
Richmond Valley Shire homepage
Historical & travel information on Woodburn from the Sydney Morning Herald

Towns in New South Wales
Northern Rivers
Richmond Valley Council